Alessandro D'Ottavio  (26 August 1927 – 25 December 1988) was an Italian boxer. He won the bronze medal at the Olympic Games in 1948 for Italy in the 67 kg category. He was born in Rome, Italy.

1948 Olympic results
Below is the record of Alessandro D'Ottavio, an Italiam welterweight boxer who competed at the 1948 London Olympics:

 Round of 32: defeated George Issaberg (Iran) on points
 Round of 16: defeated Pierre Hernandez (France) on points
 Quarterfinal: defeated Zygmunt Chychla (Poland) on points
 Semifinal:  lost to Julius Torma (Czechoslovakia) on points
 Bronze Medal Bout: defeated Duggie Du Perez (South Africa) on points (won bronze medal)

Professional career
D'Ottavio turned pro in 1950 and captured the vacant Italian light heavyweight title in 1957 with a win over Rocco Mazzola.  He retired the following year after a loss to Mazzola.

References

External links
 
 

1927 births
1988 deaths
Boxers from Rome
Welterweight boxers
Light-heavyweight boxers
Boxers at the 1948 Summer Olympics
Olympic boxers of Italy
Olympic bronze medalists for Italy
Olympic medalists in boxing
Italian male boxers
Medalists at the 1948 Summer Olympics
20th-century Italian people